Nebetnehat ("Lady of the sycamore tree"; the name was one of the attributes of the goddess Hathor) was an ancient Egyptian queen consort during the mid-18th Dynasty. She was the Great Royal Wife of an unidentified pharaoh. Her name is only known from an alabaster canopic fragment found in the valley of the Queens. The canopic jar was part of a find referred to as the Tomb of the Princesses.

Granted the fact that she held the title of Great Royal Wife, she could have been someone relatively close to Amenhotep III perhaps a daughter or some other female relative.

References

External links
 The canopic fragment on the website of the University College London
 Image of fragment on Flickr

14th-century BC Egyptian women
Queens consort of the Eighteenth Dynasty of Egypt